Slavutych is a city and municipality in northern Ukraine, purpose-built for the evacuated personnel of the Chernobyl Nuclear Power Plant after the 1986 disaster that occurred near the city of Pripyat. Geographically located within Chernihiv Raion, Chernihiv Oblast, Slavutych is administratively subordinated to the Kyiv Oblast and is part of Vyshhorod Raion. It hosts the administration of Slavutych urban hromada, one of the hromadas of Ukraine.

Geography

Slavutych is situated on the left bank of the Dnieper River, 40 kilometers (25 miles) from Chernihiv, 45 kilometers (30 miles) from the city of Pripyat, 50 kilometers (30 miles) from Chernobyl (both in Ivankiv Raion) and 200 kilometers (100 miles) from Kyiv. While being geographically located in Chernihiv Raion (part of Chernihiv Oblast, until 2020 in Ripky Raion), administratively it belongs to Kyiv Oblast. It is an administrative exclave, that prior to 2020 did not belong to any raion. Prior to 2020 administrative reform the city was classified as a city of oblast significance. In 2020 Slavutych was downgraded to a city of district significance and made part of Vyshhorod Raion.

History

Slavutych was named after the Old Slavic name (Slavutych) for the Dnieper River. The city was built in 1986 shortly after the Chernobyl nuclear disaster, to provide homes for those who had worked at the Chernobyl nuclear power plant and their families. They were evacuated from the abandoned city of Pripyat. The economic and social situation of the city is still heavily influenced by the power plant and other Chernobyl zone installations. Many of the residents still work in the energy industry in the region.

In an interview with Pravda published on 10 October 1986, Erik Pozdyshev, the newly appointed Director of the Chernobyl nuclear power plant, officially announced that a new city was to be built. Construction of the town started shortly thereafter, and the first inhabitants settled in October 1988. The city was intended to replace Pripyat which became a ghost town after it was evacuated thirty-six hours after the nuclear disaster due to radioactive material. There is a memorial in Slavutych to remember the victims of the disaster, especially to those who lost their lives immediately after the event from radiation-related diseases.

The city is mostly home to survivors of the disaster who had to be relocated from the evacuation zone around the reactor, among them about 8,000 people who were children when the disaster occurred. Many inhabitants still work at the site of the former plant for monitoring, maintenance or scientific purposes. They commute to the zone on a regular basis. A rail line (twice crossing the international border with Belarus) runs directly from the city to the site of the plant.

Slavutych is located about 50 kilometers (30 miles) east of the former plant. The site had to be a reasonable distance away from the Chernobyl zone to ensure the risk of radiation-related illnesses was reduced. However, other factors that contributed to the choosing of the site were the availability of a nearby ready railroad infrastructure, and an accessible water supply from the nearby Dnieper River. In order to build the city, the ground was covered with a two-meter (6') layer of uncontaminated soil.

Until 18 July 2020, Slavutych was incorporated as a city of oblast significance. In July 2020, as part of the administrative reform of Ukraine, which reduced the number of raions of Kyiv Oblast to seven, the city of Slavutych was merged into Vyshhorod Raion.

During the Russian invasion of Ukraine, Slavutych became encircled and isolated by the Russian forces in the course of their Kyiv offensive in late February 2022. On 25 March 2022, following days of shelling, the Russian troops entered the city, seized a hospital and detained the mayor Yuri Fomichiv, while locals took to the streets to protest the occupation.

Following the persistence of the protests when confronted with flashbang grenades and warning shots, the Russian forces agreed to leave Slavutych and release the mayor on the conditions that the Ukrainian military would not be present in the town and most weapons would be handed over to the mayor.

Infrastructure

From the start, Slavutych was planned to become a "21st-century city". Compared to other cities in Ukraine, Slavutych has a modern architecture with pleasant surroundings, and the standard of living in the city is much higher than in most other Ukrainian cities. During the construction of the city, workers and architects from eight former Soviet republics became involved: Armenian SSR, Azerbaijan SSR, Estonian SSR, Georgian SSR, Latvian SSR, Lithuanian SSR, Russian SFSR and Ukrainian SSR. As a result, the city is divided into eight districts named after the capitals of the contributing republics, each with its own unique style and atmosphere. In addition, the city has a youth center, a modern community center, a town hall, an Internet cafe, numerous sports facilities, modern clinics, and a hotel. Around 80% of housing in the city is formed by apartments while the other 20% is formed by small, family houses. The city has a uniquely high birth rate as well as surprisingly low mortality. As a result, the average age in Slavutych is by far the lowest of any city in Ukraine. More than one third of its inhabitants are under 18.

The infrastructure and public facilities of the city were mostly funded by the company which operated the Chernobyl nuclear plant. Because the remaining units of the nuclear power plant were shut down in 2001, the city faces significant social problems and an uncertain future. Until 2001, approximately 9,000 people worked at the plant. Since the shutdown, this number has dropped to 3,000, most of them working on monitoring and maintenance. 85% of the city budget was funded by the operator of the plant. In order to support the settlement and establishment of new companies, Slavutych was declared a Special Economic Zone. In addition, substantial vocational retraining programs are provided by the government to improve the occupational outlook of those who lost jobs. Despite these efforts, about 1,500 people have already left the city, a trend which is predicted to continue for the foreseeable future.

Culture 

Slavutych has been the venue of numerous cultural activities since its foundation in 1989. Most recently, the 86 Film and Urbanism Festival, which ran six editions (2013–2018) and EASA/SESAM, which was due to take place in 2020, but was postponed to 2021 due to the COVID-19 pandemic.

The unique modernist architecture of the city remains one of its main attractions, as captured in the architectural guide Slavutych, by author Ievgeniia Gubkina.

Demographics

Transport
Slavutych has a railway station, and a minor stop in the locality of Poselok Lesnoi, on the Chernihiv–Ovruch line. It is served by a branch (Semenyahivka-Slavutych) of the regional highway P56 Chernihiv-Chernobyl, and by the provincial road T2506.

Personalities
Serhiy Rozhok (b. 1985), football player
Ivan Dorn (b. 1988), singer, actor

See also
FC Slavutych

References

External links

  Slavutych City Community Website
 Half-Life: Where are the Chernobyl workers now?  documentary by Matador Network (3 January 2012)
 "Memories of the Future: Slavutych Tomorrow" participative art-project by Krolikowski Art dedicated to Slavutych
"86 International Festival of Film and Urbanism" an annual festival taking place Slavutych, with an Urbanism Program curated by METASITU

 
Cities in Kyiv Oblast
Aftermath of the Chernobyl disaster
Populated places established in the Ukrainian Soviet Socialist Republic
New towns
New towns started in the 1980s
Populated places established in 1986
1986 establishments in Ukraine
Cities of regional significance in Ukraine
Company towns in Ukraine